Alışarlı (known as Qapanlı until 2015) is a village in the municipality of İrəvanlı in the Tartar Rayon of Azerbaijan.

References

Populated places in Tartar District